The Mãe Grande de Curuçá Extractive Reserve is a coastal marine extractive reserve in the state of Pará, Brazil.

Location
 
The Mãe Grande de Curuçá Extractive Reserve is in the municipality of Curuçá, Pará.
The Curuçá River flows through the reserve from south to north, emptying into the Atlantic Ocean.
It is joined from the left by the Furo Maripanema, an arm of the Mocajuba River.
The reserve adjoins the Mocapajuba Marine Extractive Reserve and São João da Ponta Extractive Reserve to the west, and the Cuinarana Marine Extractive Reserve and Mestre Lucindo Marine Extractive Reserve to the east.

The rainy season is from January to August.
The reserve contains typical mangrove, salt marsh and riparian vegetation.
Vegetation is mostly secondary, due to intense deforestation, with mangroves along the coasts.
The West Indian manatee (Trichechus manatus) is a protected species in the reserve.

Economy

As of 2007 the reserve was inhabited by about 3,000 families with about 6,000 fishermen in 50 small communities on islands, channels, rivers and beaches.
As of 2010 there were about 11,000 residents in total.
The main festival is the religious Feast of Saint Peter.

History

Curuçá was founded in 1775, but only became a city in 1895.
Some of the municipality was split off into separate municipalities in 1939, 1955 and 1991.
The Mãe Grande de Curuçá Extractive Reserve was created by federal decree on 13 December 2002.
It is classed as IUCN protected area category VI (protected area with sustainable use of natural resources).
The objective is to protect the livelihoods and culture of the traditional extractive population, and ensure the sustainable use of natural resources of the unit.

On 22 June 2005 the Instituto Nacional de Colonização e Reforma Agrária (INCRA: National Institute for Colonization and Agrarian Reform) recognised the reserve as meeting the needs of 1,600 families of small rural producers, who would qualify for PRONAF support.
The Brazilian Institute of Environment and Renewable Natural Resources (IBAMA) created the deliberative council on 9 March 2006 with the aim of helping to create and implement the management plan and to make the reserve a reality.
On 23 March 2010 responsibility was transferred to  the Chico Mendes Institute for Biodiversity Conservation (ICMBio).
The same day ICMBio granted the right of use to the Users' Association of the reserve (Associação dos Usuários da Reserva Extrativista Mãe Grande de Curuçá - AUREMAG).

Notes

Sources

2002 establishments in Brazil
Protected areas of Pará
Marine extractive reserves of Brazil
Protected areas established in 2002